The fuel factor, fo, is the ratio of created CO2 to depleted oxygen in a combustion reaction, used to check the accuracy of an emission measurement system.  It can be calculated using the equation

fo = (20.9 - %O2)/%CO2,

Where %O2 is the percent O2 by volume, dry basis, %CO2 is the percent CO2 by volume, dry basis, and 20.9 is the percent O2 by volume in ambient air.  The Fuel factor can be corrected for the amount of CO, by adding the percent CO on a dry basis to the CO2, and subtracting half of the percent CO from the O2.

References

See also
 Portable emissions measurement system
 Air–fuel ratio

Fuels